Wilderness Island is the 2.7 hectare island between the Wandle and Wrythe in Carshalton in the London Borough of Sutton. It is designated a Local Nature Reserve and a Site of Metropolitan Importance for Nature Conservation, is owned by Sutton Council and is managed by the London Wildlife Trust.

Features
A fish pond still remains from a former public garden on the site. Other habitats are woodland, meadows and river. Trees include a black poplar, and there are birds such as the woodpecker, kingfisher and grebe. Butterflies/moths include the speckled wood, holly blue, and the rare hornet clearwing moth. The ponds are an important habitat which have a variety of wetland plants.

It is designated a Local Nature Reserve and a Site of Metropolitan Importance for Nature Conservation. The site is owned by Sutton Council and managed by the London Wildlife Trust.

Visitors, who must arrive on foot, must obey the envionrmental laws of Britain including not disturbing nesting birds at the small site; they have one access — from River Gardens.

History

The island from the seventeenth century was the site of copper mills. It was later the site of a pleasure garden.

References

Local nature reserves in Greater London
Nature reserves in the London Borough of Sutton
London Wildlife Trust